The Women's Moguls event in freestyle skiing at the 2002 Winter Olympics in Salt Lake City, United States took place on 9 February at Park City.

Results

Qualification
The qualification round was held at 09:00, with 29 skiers competing. The top 16 advanced to the final.

Final
The final was held at 12:00.

References

Women's freestyle skiing at the 2002 Winter Olympics
Women's events at the 2002 Winter Olympics